Guzamala is a Local Government Area of Borno State, Nigeria. Its headquarters are in the town of Gudumbali. It's located approximately 125 kilometres north of the state capital, Maiduguri.

It is a part of the traditional Borno Emirate.

This Local Government Area is located very close to the northern axis of Borno state. It is bordered by six LGAs. These LGAs are Mobber, Gubio, Nganzal, Monguno, Kukawa and Abadan LGAs.

It has 10 local wards. They are:- Aduwa, Gudumbali East, Gudumbali West, Guworam, Guzamala East, Guzamala West, kingarwa, Maijari, Moduri, Wamiri.

It has an area of 2,517 km and a population of 95,648 at the 2006 census.

The postal code of the area is 612.

The Kanuri ethnic group lives in the LGA.

It is one of the sixteen LGAs that constitute the Borno Emirate, a traditional state located in Borno State, Nigeria.
In June 2022 it was reported that all but two villages within Guzamala were under ISWAP control, including the area's administrative headquarters at Gudumbali.

References

Local Government Areas in Borno State